Morten Berg Thomsen (born 14 September 1984 in Esbjerg, Denmark) is a Danish curler.

He participated at the 2018 Winter Olympics where the Danish men's team finished in tenth place.

Teams

References

External links
 
 2018 Winter Olympics profile (web archive)
 Welcome to Team Stjerne - Danish National Curling Team
 
 

Living people
1984 births
People from Esbjerg
Curlers at the 2018 Winter Olympics
Olympic curlers of Denmark
Danish male curlers
Sportspeople from the Region of Southern Denmark
21st-century Danish people